Scofield may refer to:

People
 Barbara Scofield (born 1926), American tennis player
 Bryant T. Scofield (1823–1881), American lawyer and politician
 C. I. Scofield (1843–1921), American theologian and author of the Scofield Reference Bible
 Dean Scofield (born 1957), American voice actor
 Edward Scofield (1842–1925), American Republican politician and 19th Governor of Wisconsin (1897–1901)
 Glenni William Scofield (1817–1891), American politician and judge
 Hiram Scofield (1830–1906), American Civil War officer in the Union Army 
 John Scofield (born 1951), American jazz-rock guitarist and composer
 Paul Scofield (1922–2008), British stage and film actor

Fictional characters
 Maureen Scofield, in Close to Home
 Michael Scofield, protagonist of American TV series Prison Break (2005–2009)

Places
 Scofield, Michigan
 Scofield, Utah
 Scofield Mine disaster, in 1900
 Scofield Reservoir

See also
Schofield (disambiguation)
Scholefield, a surname